Feel My Power is the debut studio album by M.C. Hammer released in 1986 by Bustin’ Records. The album was produced by Felton Pilate of Con Funk Shun. 

Feel My Power sold over 60,000 copies, a considerable success for a small independent label of the era, which led to several offers from major labels.

"That's What I Said" and "Feel My Power" were later used for the Rocky V film and the Rocky V soundtrack. "The Thrill Is Gone" samples the original song by Roy Hawkins and Rick Darnell. Additionally, the album samples James Brown.

Track listing

References

1986 debut albums
MC Hammer albums